The Outlaw's Revenge is a 1915 silent American biographical drama film, directed by Christy Cabanne. It stars Raoul Walsh, Irene Hunt, and Teddy Sampson, and was released on April 15, 1915.

Cast list
 Raoul Walsh as the outlaw
 Irene Hunt as the outlaw's elder sister
 Teddy Sampson as the outlaw's younger sister
 Mae Marsh an American lover
 Robert Harron an American lover
 Eagle Eye as the outlaw's servant
 Walter Long as federal officer
 William E. "Babe" Lawrence as federal officer
 Spottiswoode Aitken as federal officer

References

External links

American silent feature films
American black-and-white films
Silent American drama films
1915 drama films
1915 films
1910s English-language films
1910s American films